WBMQ (630 kHz) was a commercial AM radio station in Savannah, Georgia. It was owned by Cumulus Media and aired a news/talk format. The studios and offices were on Television Circle in Savannah. The transmitter was off Dulany Avenue near the Savannah River.

WBMQ's weekday schedule was made up of mostly syndicated conservative talk shows from the co-owned Westwood One Network. They included Michael Savage, Chris Plante, Mark Levin, Clark Howard, Phil Valentine, John Batchelor, Red Eye Radio and America in the Morning with John Trout. Most hours began with Westwood One News. NBC-TV network affiliate WSAV-TV 3 supplied WBMQ with some local news and weather. (At one time, the two stations had been co-owned.)

History

Early years as WSAV
On December 29, 1939, the station first signed on as WSAV, with the call sign standing for "SAVannah." It broadcast at 1310 kilocycles at a power of only 100 watts. Studios and offices were in the Liberty National Bank Building. After the North American Regional Broadcasting Agreement (NARBA) took effect in 1941, the station moved to AM 1340. WSAV was an NBC Red Network affiliate, carrying its schedule of dramas, comedies, news, sports, soap operas, game shows and big band broadcasts during the Golden Age of Radio.

In 1947, an FM station was added, 100.3 WSAV-FM. It mostly simulcast the AM station's programming, but management did not see much of a future for FM radio and was more interested in building a TV station. Because of this, WSAV-FM stopped broadcasting in the mid-1950s and the license was turned in.

Move to AM 630
In 1949, WSAV moved to AM 630, coupled with a big boost in power. WSAV began running at 5,000 watts around the clock, non-directional by day but using a directional antenna at night to protect other stations on the frequency. WSAV used a three-tower antenna array on Oatland Island.
 
In 1956, WSAV put Savannah's second TV station on the air. WSAV had battled with rival radio station 900 WJIV for the last VHF TV license available in Savannah. (Channel 11 WTOC-TV had gone on the air two years earlier.) WSAV emerged the winner. Channel 3 WSAV-TV became an NBC-TV affiliate, since WSAV was an NBC Radio affiliate.

Sale to Beasley
In 1977, management decided to sell the radio station, while retaining the TV station. AM 630 WSAV was sold to Beasley Broadcasting. Because two stations that were no longer co-owned could not share the same call letters, AM 630 became WKBX. Beasley teamed up the station with FM station 95.5 WSGF, which it also owned. (WSGF is now active rock WIXV.) WKBX's full service middle of the road format was continued for several years. But in 1981, the station switched to a Christian radio format. In 1983, WKBX began airing country music. It changed to WBMQ in 1985 and began playing oldies.

WBMQ and WSGF were bought by Radio Southeast in 1988. Radio Southeast changed WBMQ's format to talk in 1990. The station featured local hosts and at night carried syndicated shows from NBC Talknet. World and national news was supplied by CBS Radio News.

Sale to Cumulus
In 1998, Cumulus Media bought WBMQ and its FM sister station, WIXV. Cumulus also acquired 93.1 WEAS-FM, 96.5 WJCL-FM, 900 WJLG and 102.1 WZAT, creating a six-station cluster. All of the stations were moved to studios on Television Circle in Savannah.

In the early 2010s, WBMQ gave up its transmitter site on Oatland Island, and moved to a new location in Savannah, near the Savannah River. Because it was now using a single non-directional tower, it had to reduce its output. Daytime power dropped slightly to 4,800 watts, and nighttime power was reduced significantly to 47 watts. While the daytime signal covered a large region of Coastal Georgia and South Carolina, the nighttime signal only served Savannah and its adjacent communities.

WBMQ's transmitter was damaged by a lightning storm in July 2020, taking the station silent; WJLG, which operated from the same site, would remain on the air at reduced power. That October 9, Cumulus elected to return both stations' licenses to the Federal Communications Commission (FCC) instead of making repairs; the surrender also invalidated a construction permit for an FM translator station, W245DD (96.9), to relay WBMQ. WBMQ's license was cancelled on October 13, 2020.

References

External links
FCC Station Search Details: DWBMQ (Facility ID: 54800)
FCC History Cards for WBMQ (covering 1938-1979 as WSAV / WKBX)

BMQ
Radio stations established in 1939
Radio stations disestablished in 2020
Defunct radio stations in the United States
BMQ
1939 establishments in Georgia (U.S. state)
2020 disestablishments in Georgia (U.S. state)